"Escapism" is a song by British singer-songwriter Raye featuring American rapper 070 Shake. It was released independently on 12 October 2022 as the third single from the album as a double A-side with "The Thrill Is Gone", and appears on her debut album My 21st Century Blues (2023). It was co-written by Raye, 070 Shake and Mike Sabath, with Sabath handling production. "Escapism" is an uptempo R&B, electropop and hip hop song with lyrics speaking of escaping from reality and dealing with heartbreak.

"Escapism." went viral on TikTok and began charting internationally in late 2022. It went on to become Raye's first number-one single in the UK and has received a platinum BPI certification. It also topped the charts in Ireland and Denmark and entered the top ten of the charts in over twenty music markets including Australia, Germany, New Zealand and Switzerland, as well the top twenty in Hungary and Belgium and the top forty in Nigeria and France. Furthermore, it became both Raye and 070 Shake's first song to chart on the US Billboard Hot 100, peaking at number 22. 

The song's accompanying music video, directed by Raye and Otis Dominique, depicts the singer turning to "partying, drinking and drugs to escape her emotions and numb her feelings" after breaking up with her boyfriend. Raye has performed the song live on Later with Jools Holland and The Late Show with Stephen Colbert.

Composition and lyrics
"Escapism" incorporates trip hop in its production. Raye stated that she "love[s] how rebellious" "Escapism" is for disregarding "the standard" of "pop music structure", particularly being "longer than three minutes and twenty seconds".

The song depicts Raye in a post-breakup spree of unhealthy coping mechanisms, engaging in hookups, drugs, and alcohol. Raye explained that the song is about escaping from reality and dealing with heartbreak. In an interview with Clash, Raye revealed that she wrote the song in a log cabin in Utah: "Me and a friend hired a car, and drove up there, in the middle of winter, through the snow and everything! 'Escapism' is a story about running away from everything as fast as you can. The lyrics are about just leaving everyone on read, and going out on your own. It came from a messy time, but as humans, we just have to keep surviving!"

Critical reception
Amit Vaidya of Rolling Stone India named "Escapism" one of the Best International Songs of 2022. They added how "Escapism" showcases Raye's "journey to achieving her musical freedom", and how "Escapism" "perfectly captures the angst and the aura of the singer – a vocal shape-shifter who now is the boss and we just love it!"

Commercial performance
After going viral on TikTok, "Escapism" charted on the UK Singles Chart at number 31 on 25 November 2022, which marked 070 Shake's first entry on the chart. The feat marked the singer's first charting solo single since Raye became an independent artist in 2021. The following week, the song ascended to number six, becoming Raye's first single as a solo artist to reach the top ten in the UK. On 9 December, "Escapism" climbed to number two, becoming Raye's highest-charting single to date, passing her collaborations "You Don't Know Me" with Jax Jones (2016) and "Bed" with Joel Corry and David Guetta (2021). Following the Christmas period, "Escapism" ascended to number one on the UK Singles Chart in January 2023, marking both Raye and 070 Shake's first chart-topping single of their careers.

In the United States, "Escapism" became both artists' first song to chart on the Billboard Hot 100, peaking at number 22. In Canada, "Escapism" became Raye's first charting single as a lead artist of her career on the Canadian Hot 100, peaking at number nine on the chart dated 21 January 2023.

Music video
A music video for the song was released on 9 November 2022, directed by Raye and Otis Dominique. It reflects the song's lyrics, with Raye turning to "partying, drinking and drugs to escape her emotions and numb her feelings" after breaking up with her boyfriend. The video makes use of point-of-view cameras. In an interview with Shots, Raye mentioned "we worked really hard to create an honest depiction of where I was at that time in my life. It was fun and wild. We shot it over a couple of days and wore point-of-view cameras during a wild night out at many different clubs. I pushed myself outside of my comfort zone and I ran 150 meters in 5-inch heels. We really took it there!"

Live performances
On 15 October 2022, Raye performed "Escapism" live for the first time on Later with Jools Holland. In December 2022, the singer released a live performance recorded at Metropolis Studios in London. On 13 February 2023, Raye made her US network television debut performance on The Late Show with Stephen Colbert.

Charts

Certifications

Release history

References

2022 singles
2022 songs
Irish Singles Chart number-one singles
Number-one singles in Denmark
Raye (singer) songs
070 Shake songs
Songs written by 070 Shake
Songs written by Mike Sabath
Songs written by Raye (singer)
UK Singles Chart number-one singles
Contemporary R&B songs
Electropop songs
Hip hop songs